Gignac is a commune in the Hérault département in the Occitanie region in southern France.

Population
Its inhabitants are called Gignacois.

Sights
 Gignac Bridge over the river Hérault, completed 1810.
 Church of Notre-Dame-de-Grâce
 "Tour sarrasine" tower

Personalities
Antoine de Laurès (1708–1779), writer, friend of Voltaire, translator into French of Pharsalia by Lucan (Marcus Annaeus Lucanus), and author of La fête de Cythère, a one-act opera created on 19 November 1753 at the Château de Berny. He lived in the Château de Gignac.

Map

See also
Communes of the Hérault department

References

External links

 Official site 

Communes of Hérault